Onomastus maskeliya, is a species of spider of the genus Onomastus. It is endemic to Sri Lanka.
Onomastus maskeliya inhabits high altitude cloud forests, as a result, its distribution is limited.

References

External links
Onomastus

Endemic fauna of Sri Lanka
Salticidae
Spiders of Asia
Spiders described in 2016